Park Yong-kyun (born 16 August 1967) is a former Korean boxer. He was the WBA & Lineal  Featherweight champion from 1991–1993.

Park is best known for his victories over Antonio Esparragoza and Eloy Rojas. Park also defeated Ever Beleno, Tae-Shik Chun, Seiji Asakawa, Masuaki Takeda, Thanomchit Kiatkriengkrai and Cris Saguid.

See also
Lineal championship
List of Korean boxers

References

External links

|-

|-

1967 births
Living people
Featherweight boxers
Sportspeople from Seoul
South Korean male boxers
World Boxing Association champions